The Beijing–Zhangjiakou intercity railway, also known as the Jingzhang intercity railway, Jingzhang high speed railway, Jingzhang section of Beijing-Baotou PDL, is a high-speed railway between Beijing and Zhangjiakou in Hebei province, China. The line was opened on 30 December 2019, and is the world's first driverless high speed railway, shortening the traveling time from Beijing to Zhangjiakou from 3 hours 7 minutes to 47 minutes. It forms part of both the Beijing–Lanzhou corridor and the Beijing–Zhangjiakou–Datong–Taiyuan branch of the Beijing–Kunming corridor.

The main line has 10 stations. The Chongli Branch has two more stations, Zhaochuan South (reserved station) and Taizicheng. The Yanqing branch has another station, Yanqing railway station. The main line and the Chongli branch opened on December 30, 2019. The Yanqing branch opened on December 1, 2020.

The railway was originally scheduled to start construction in 2009. However, because the Ministry of Railways adjusted the high-speed rail construction program, this was postponed until 2014. This railway connects with the Zhangjiakou–Hohhot high-speed railway and Datong–Zhangjiakou high-speed railway in Zhangjiakou.

Route description

Leading north from Beijing North railway station the line passes the stations of Qinghe, Shahe and Changping. It enters a tunnel under the Great Wall at Badaling and arriving at Badaling Great Wall railway station, avoiding the famous switchback, zigzag conventional railway line. North of this, a branch from the tunnel connects to Yanqing in preparation for the 2022 Winter Olympic Games venues there. After entering Hebei province, there is a station at Donghuayuan North and the line runs next to the Beijing-Zhangjiakou highway across the Guanting Reservoir before arriving at the stations at Huailai, Xiahuayuan North and Xuanhua North before terminating at the existing Zhangjiakou railway station.

The project had an estimated investment cost of 23.62 billion Yuan. Construction of the unit was carried out by the "Beijing-Zhangjiakou Intercity Railway Limited", a company incorporated in November 7, 2013. Registered capital of 100 million yuan. Shareholders are in this company are the Beijing Railway Bureau (60.02%), Beijing Infrastructure Investment Co. Ltd. (formerly the Beijing Subway Group Co., Ltd.) (32.42%) and Zhangjiakou Winton Holdings Limited with 7.56% of total shares.

Stations

Main Line

Yanqing Branch
Yanqing branch opened on December 1, 2020.

Chongli Branch
Also known as "Chongli railway" or "Winter Olympics Branch". The section from Taizicheng to Chongli is also part of the future Taizicheng-Xilinhot railway.

2022 Winter Olympic Games

The Beijing-Zhangjiakou intercity railway is considered a crucial and vital link between all three venue clusters for the 2022 Winter Olympics to be held in Beijing. The urban area of Beijing will host most of the indoor skating, ice hockey and curling events plus the opening and closing ceremonies. Yanqing District, a suburban district of Beijing, will host Alpine skiing plus the luge and bobsleigh. Zhangjiakou, a city in Hebei Province, will host Nordic skiing, snowboarding and freestyle skiing. This railway places all venues within one hour of each other.

References

High-speed railway lines in China
Rail transport in Beijing
Railway lines opened in 2019
Zhangjiakou